St-Imier railway station is a railway station in the municipality of Saint-Imier, in the Swiss canton of Bern. It is an intermediate stop on the standard gauge Biel/Bienne–La Chaux-de-Fonds line of Swiss Federal Railways.

St-Imier (funiculaire), the lower station of Funiculaire Saint-Imier-Mont-Soleil, is about 800 m away.

Services
The following services stop at St-Imier:

 Regio: hourly service between La Chaux-de-Fonds and Biel/Bienne.

References

External links 
 
 

Railway stations in the canton of Bern
Swiss Federal Railways stations